O'Fallon Park is a municipal park in St. Louis, Missouri, that opened in 1908.

Description
The park is named after John O'Fallon, a colonel who fought in the War of 1812 and nephew of William Clark. The park is 126.63 acres and was once part of O'Fallon's 600-acre land holding. The park has a lake with a boathouse. It has basketball courts, tennis courts, softball fields, and a football field. It has a playground, multiple picnic grounds, and a spray pool.

Geography
O'Fallon Park is located near the riverfront. On the north, it is bordered by Interstate 70; on the southwest, by W. Florissant Ave. The southeastern border follows E. Harris Ave., Algernon St., and Adelaide Ave.

Surrounding areas
O'Fallon Park is surrounded by five St. Louis neighborhoods. North Riverfront borders the north, Penrose borders the west, Near North Riverfront borders the east by a tip, and finally two neighborhoods border the south, O'Fallon and College Hill.

See also
John O'Fallon
People and culture of St. Louis, Missouri
Neighborhoods of St. Louis
Parks in St. Louis, Missouri

References

External links
 O'Fallon Park - Official St. Louis Park Department website

Parks in St. Louis
Culture of St. Louis
Tourist attractions in St. Louis
1908 establishments in Missouri